German (English equivalent: Herman; 19 August 1899 – 27 August 1991) was the 43rd Patriarch of the Serbian Orthodox Church from 1958 to 1990. He was successful in revitalizing the Serbian Orthodox Church to a certain extent during the Communist period, despite two schisms that occurred during his tenure.

The full title of German was: His Holiness, the Archbishop of Peć, Metropolitan of Belgrade and Karlovci, and Serbian Patriarch German

Education and early career 
Patriarch German was born Hranislav Đorić on August 19, 1899, in the spa town of Jošanička Banja in central Serbia, in a family of teachers, and latter priest. His father, Mihajlo Đorić of Velika Drenova, graduated from Belgrade's prestigious Seminary in 1895. Hranislav Đorić received a broad education and was among most educated members of the Serbian clergy, attending primary school in Velika Drenova and Kruševac, seminary in Belgrade and Sremski Karlovci (graduating in 1921), studying law in Paris' Sorbonne and finally graduating from the University of Belgrade's Orthodox Theology Faculty in 1942.

He was ordained a deacon by the bishop of Žiča Jefrem, and appointed the clerk of the Canon-law Court in Čačak and also a catechist in the Čačak's high school. Due to ill health, he left the administrative jobs and 1927, he was ordained a presbyter, receiving his own parish of Miokovci. In 1931 he was transferred to a parish in Vrnjačka Banja. After the election of Serbian Patriarch Gavrilo V in 1938, father Hranislav became a referent of the Holy Synod of the Serbian Orthodox Church. In that capacity, he was elected a vicar bishop of Moravica and, becoming a widower, he took monastic vows in Studenica monastery, July 7, 1951, acquiring the name German (Herman). Patriarch Vikentije, together with bishops Valerijan of Šumadija, Nikanor of Bačka and Vasilije of Banja Luka ordained him a bishop, July 15 in Cathedral Church of Belgrade. The new bishop became at the same time the secretary general of the Holy Synod and editor in chief of the Glasnik, the official gazette of the Serbian Orthodox Church.

In 1952 he was appointed a bishop of the Eparchy of Buda in Hungary, by Holy Assembly of Hiyerarchs of Serbian Orthodox Church. However, as Hungarian authorities didn't approve his appointment neither allowed him to enter the country, so he was never officially enthroned. In 1956 he was appointed the bishop of Žiča, at that time, semi-officially, the second office of importance in the church, after the patriarch. In this capacity, he was also an administrator (acting bishop) of Budimlja and Polimlje and Raška and Prizren eparchies.

Patriarch

Appointment controversy 
When Patriarch Vikentije II suddenly died on July 5, 1958, internal strife struck the church leadership and no agreement could be reached on who would succeed him. German was not even appointed as the guardian of the throne (acting patriarch), instead the bishop of Braničevo, Hrizostom Vojinović was appointed to vacate the post. It is believed that German's election was a compromise, but the still popular story is that Aleksandar Ranković, the top Serbian Communist official at that time, and later Josip Broz Tito's deputy, entered the Holy Synod's session, bringing German inside, and saying: "This is your new patriarch!"

German was elected the 43rd Patriarch of Peć on September 14, 1958. However, some sources claim a much higher number, as a result of over a dozen of people who occupied the throne, but were not officially ordained or recognized as such (such as several rebel-patriarchs in the 16th century during the Ottoman occupation) or the Patriarchs of Karlovci in Austria-Hungary which are not counted in the list of official patriarchs (especially not as patriarchs of Peć, instead calling themselves patriarchs of the Serbs).

Schisms 
Like most Orthodox churches in the Eastern Bloc, the Serbian Orthodox Church under German was forced to strike a modus vivendi with the ruling League of Communists in order to procure the space it needed to operate. The diaspora priests, led by the vocally anti-communist Bishop Dionisije, claimed that the Belgrade "red priests" had acquiesced too early. After the Holy Synod started a trial against Dionisije for allegations about his personal life, he went into schism with the church in November 1963. Starting in 1977, the group assumed the name "Free Serbian Orthodox Church". It was reconciled with the SOC in 1992, under German's successor Pavle.

The schism of the Macedonian Orthodox Church is a much deeper and complicated issue. It began in 1958, the very year of German's election, with an allegedly willing acceptance of the autonomy of Ohrid Archbishopric proclaimed by the archbishop Dositej. This was a great blow to German's religious authority as it was a forced acceptance, pushed by the Communist Party. In the next 9 years, the patriarch and archbishop held several joint liturgies, even with the heads of other Orthodox Churches. However, in 1967, archbishop Dositej completely split his archbishopric (within the borders of the SR Macedonia) from the mother church, claiming heritage from the historical Archbishopric of Ohrid, which had been non-existent for 200 years. German and the Serbian Orthodox Church, claiming the separation was forced and uncanonical (in other words, they deemed it a church established by the Communists) ended any canonical communication with the Macedonian Orthodox Church. In turn, German's example was followed by all the other Orthodox Churches. The problem continued after German and the breakup of Yugoslavia, and it became a highly political issue, not only with the Serbian Orthodox Church, but with the Church of Greece and the Bulgarian Orthodox Church. This schism continued until 2022, when the Macedonian church reconciled with the Serbian Patriarchate and was granted full autonomy and subsequently autocephaly by Patriarch Porfirije of Serbia.

Revitalization and consequences 

German set to revitalize the Serbian Orthodox Church, which (like other religious communities in Yugoslavia) received no state support. During his entire tenure, he kept a low profile, while achieving certain goals in this direction. Despite harsh conditions, he managed to form several new dioceses: Western Europe (1969), Australia (1973), Vranje (1975) and Canada (1983).

He oversaw the finishing works on the new seminary complex of buildings in Belgrade (including the campus) in 1958, so today the entire neighborhood surrounding the complex is known as Bogoslovija (Serbian for seminary). He also opened new seminary in the Krka monastery in SR Croatia. He was very involved in appointing bishops, staunchly pushing his own candidates, especially in the case of the Metropolitanate of Montenegro and the Littoral after the Communists arrested Metropolitan Arsenije Bradvarević in 1954, but German managed to appoint his protégé, Danilo Dajković in 1961. He also sent many priests to SR Montenegro as clerical activities had almost completely ceased there after the war.

In 1984, German visited the site of the Jasenovac concentration camp, saying a now famous line: "To forgive, we must ...to forget, we must not" (Опростити морамо, заборавити не смемо).

Many consider German's greatest achievement to be his successful campaign for the resumption of the construction of the Church of Saint Sava in Belgrade, which was stopped in 1941. In 26 years from his appointment, he urged the Communist government 88 times until they finally authorized the construction to continue in 1984. Being a massive project, it took a long time and the church was completed in 2021.

Patriarch German was a pragmatic religious leader in times that were very oppressive for religion. After the death of Josip Broz Tito in 1980, he slowly pushed church issues as Yugoslav society changed and nationalism grew among the various peoples, and in the end he was universally popular among the Serbs and had become a part of the Serbian social elite.

In 1989, patriarch German broke his hip, which led to a series of surgeries and repeated injuries, so the already old patriarch was unable to perform his duties. As a result of this, the Holy Synod declared him incapacitated on November 30, 1990, and appointed the metropolitan bishop of Zagreb and Ljubljana Jovan Pavlović as the guardian of the throne and elected the new patriarch, Pavle, on December 1, 1990. Patriarch German died in the VMA hospital in Belgrade on August 27, 1991, aged 92, and was buried in Belgrade's St. Mark's Church.

His tenure of 32 years is one of the longest in the history of the Serbian Orthodox Church.

He was awarded the Order of Saint Sava, Order of the Yugoslav flag, Legion of Honour, Order of George I, National Order of the Cedar and a number of other decorations and awards.

See also 
 List of 20th-century religious leaders

References

Bibliography 

 
Serbian Church in History at the Orthodox Research Institute
 Ko je ko u Jugoslaviji 1970; Hronometar, Belgrade
 Srpska porodična enciklopedija, Vol. VI (2006); Narodna knjiga and Politika NM;  (NK)
 Mala Prosvetina Enciklopedija, Third edition (1985); Prosveta;

External links
 Documentary movie about German (in Serbian)

1899 births
1991 deaths
People from Raška, Serbia
People from the Kingdom of Serbia
Patriarchs of the Serbian Orthodox Church
Eastern Orthodox Christians from Serbia
20th-century Eastern Orthodox bishops
University of Belgrade Faculty of Orthodox Theology alumni
Burials at St. Mark's Church, Belgrade
Recipients of the Order of St. Sava
Order of George I
Recipients of the Legion of Honour
Serbian Orthodox Church in Hungary